Walk-Over shoes is a historic shoe brand in the U.S. It was established in 1874 by George Eldon Keith as George E. Keith Co. He donated land to Brockton, Massachusetts and Keith Park was named for him.

Shoemaking was a family business. George E. Keith (February 5, 1850 - December 8, 1920) continued it and opened a factory. In 1899, Keith opened a store in London. A women's shoe line was added in 1902. By 1920 several production plants, factories, a distribution center in St. Louis, and stores in England and France were part of the business. It had stores in cities including Detroit at 152 Woodward Avenue. It had several stores in Chicago. Walk-Overs were sold by L.L. Bean when it was a shop.

The shoes were made in the Campello section of Brockton, Massachusetts. and Middleboro, Massachusetts.

In 1919 Keith gave a talk at the Waldorf Astoria hotel in New York City about Walk-Over's export business. The company filed an unfair competition suit against a store selling shoes as Walk-Overs that were not from the company.

Walk-Over also made shoes under contract for department stores. Walk-Over released a postcard set of 24 famous Americans to advertise its shoes.

References

1874 establishments in Massachusetts
Shoe brands
Shoe companies